Edward Clear was a retired American soccer defender who earned five caps with the U.S. national team in 1968.

Early Life
Ed Clear was born on the Northside of St. Louis, Missouri on May 15, 1944, to James, a lifelong civil servant working with the US Postal Service, and Marie Clear, a housewife and part-time waitress. He was the second of five children: his three sisters Carol, Katie, and Mary Bridget, and brother Doug. He grew up playing CYC soccer and baseball for his local Catholic parish team, Holy Rosary. Later he played both sports for his high school, Christian Brothers College.
During the years between his school playing days and his professional career, Clear played for several high profile soccer teams in the St. Louis area: Schumacher, Kutis, and White Star FC.

Professional
He played professionally for the St. Louis Stars in both the National Professional Soccer League and North American Soccer League from 1967 to 1969.

National team
Clear gained his first of five caps with the U.S. national team in a 3–3 tie with Israel.  He played the next three games with the U.S., then did not play in the next two U.S. games.  His final appearance with the U.S. came in a 1-0 World Cup qualifier victory over Canada on October 27, 1968.  He was a substitute for Bob Gansler.

Clear was inducted into the St. Louis Soccer Hall of Fame on November 14, 1996.

Personal life 
After his retirement from soccer he married Joan (Hummel) Clear in April 1969. He went on to have 7 children and 13 grandchildren. The couple divorced in 1980. He would later marry Barb (Bilger) Clear, with whom he would remain married until his death. Edward McCabe Clear died March 18, 2022, from complications caused from a heart attack he suffered at his South St. Louis home.

References

External links
 NASL stats

1944 births
Living people
Soccer players from St. Louis
American soccer players
National Professional Soccer League (1967) players
North American Soccer League (1968–1984) players
St. Louis Stars (soccer) players
United States men's international soccer players
Association football midfielders